A food court (in Asia-Pacific also called food hall or hawker centre) is generally an indoor plaza or common area within a facility that is contiguous with the counters of multiple food vendors and provides a common area for self-serve dinner. It can also be a public dining area in front of a cafe or diner. 

Food courts may be found in shopping malls, airports, and parks. In various regions (such as Asia, the Americas, and Africa), it may be a standalone development. In some places of learning such as high schools and universities, food courts have also come to replace or complement traditional cafeterias.

Typical usage

Food courts consist of a number of vendors at food stalls or service counters. Meals are ordered at one of the vendors and then carried to a common dining area. The food may also be ordered as takeout for consumption at another location, such as a home, or workplace. In this case, it may be packaged in plastic or foam food containers, though one common food tray used by all the stalls might also be utilized to carry food to the tables. Vendors at food courts may also sell packed meals for consumers to take home.

Food is usually eaten with plastic cutlery, and sporks are sometimes used to avoid the necessity of providing both forks and spoons. There are exceptions: Carrefour Laval requires its food court tenants to use solid dinnerware and cutlery which it provides.

Typical North American and European food courts have mostly fast-food chains (such as McDonald's, Sbarro, and Panda Express) in combination with other independent vendors. 

Cuisines and choices are varied, with larger food courts offering more global choices. Asian and African food courts are mostly private vendors that offer local cuisine. In Singapore, food courts and hawker centres are the people's main eating choice when dining out.

Common materials used in constructing food courts are tile, linoleum, Formica, stainless steel, and glass, all of which facilitate easy cleanup.

History
The second-floor food court at the Paramus Park shopping mall in Paramus, New Jersey, which opened in March 1974, has been credited as the first successful shopping mall food court in the United States. However, a food court at the Sherway Gardens shopping center in Toronto, Ontario, Canada, was constructed three years earlier. Built by the Rouse Company, one of the leading mall building companies of the time, it followed an unsuccessful attempt at the Plymouth Meeting Mall in 1971, which reportedly failed because it was "deemed too small and insufficiently varied". 

The concept has since evolved in the US in the form of the food hall which has increased in popularity in the US.

In Jakarta food court has evolved into food-park concept, where food stalls are located on park like open space. There are several food-parks in Jakarta now.

Evolution 

In the 1990s, food courts became a shopping mall staple. Food courts became such an integral part of culture that colleges and universities began to incorporate food-court like settings in their cafeteria, and even bringing in name-brand franchises (KFC, Taco Bell, Subway, etc.) into partnership with the schools. Soon after, airports, as well as many office buildings, incorporated food court layouts in their public spaces as it allows franchises and businesses to gain a wide spectrum of consumers for profit.

In 2010, eating out became more common for an average American in comparison to eating at-home meals. Approximately 47% of their food budget would go towards eating out at restaurants or at food courts. Due to this, North Americans have begun to become more aware of health. With the sudden outburst of the fast-food centric, North American consumer deviating from the food court culture to a more health conscious society, many businesses are more at risk due to the inability of maintaining the same high level of revenue. With that, the food court industry has had to find a solution to keep consumers continue using their services. Food courts have slowly begun to resemble European inspired food halls. Many shopping centres have high demand, and by transforming their food courts into food halls, businesses believe that they are able to attract the newer generation of health-conscious customers. Though food courts still exist, many food hall elements have been brought up into food court settings. In order for food businesses to do well in the food court, businesses feel as though they have to keep up with the popularity of fresh food and stray away from the traditional unhealthy, fast food reputation of food courts.

One of the main concerns for upcoming new food businesses is the overgrowing of competition in restaurants, and due to the uncertainty for rush times and customer interests, businesses then opt for going into the food court industry. With the ever-growing trends of food industry expectations, businesses then struggle to make a name for themselves in the food court setting. For example, in 2009, mall sales reached an approximated $49 billion, and food courts generally did better than other foodservices inside the malls. The sales, per-square-foot, for food courts declined only 1.7 percent during that year, while fast-food outlets and full-service restaurants inside malls decline 4,4 and 6 percent, respectively, according to the ICSC. For several years, Business Insider names Panda Express as one of the first notorious successful food court business that is widely noted by many other food industry insiders. One of the reasons for Panda Express' success was due to their constant change and upgrading of their menu items.

Costco Wholesale has one of the largest and most successful businesses that benefit from the revenue generated by food court sales. They deviate from the movement of health conscious, gourmet, and pricey image that other food retailers aim for. While many food court businesses go for the healthy and fresh image, Costco brands their food court to simply be fitting of the stereotypical fast food image. By placing their food court near the exit of their store, Costco is able to generate a bit more revenue as a part of their business plan to allow customers to linger around in their store longer to purchase more products from their company. It is one of their main business strategies, since Costco is known for its bulk products, its prices, and its food court.

Modernized malls like those run by Cadillac Fairview have improved their food courts to appeal to the general consumer, since food courts used to only attract the younger, more conscious, "student" consumer. However, with recent developments with the interior and vendors operating has allowed for everyone to enjoy the experience of being in a food court, as many would describe it to be a "community experience".

Since the experience of localized and fusion food trends have been very prominent in North American culture, food trucks have recently been a trend in the industry. Combining the local aspect of food trucks with the community aspect of food courts allow for the commencement of the recent trend of food truck rallies. As food is a huge aspect of culture and diversity, consumers have been intrigued with the fusion between the customs of food trucks and food courts. With the popularization of the food truck rallies in the states, many larger North American cities like Toronto, Montreal, Los Angeles, and New York have followed the trend and started up their own food truck festivals in the summer to allow the possibility of  many food court businesses and vendors to make a name for themselves. By using food trucks as a promotional tool, many vendors are able to brand themselves to fit the demand of local businesses in the realm of franchise competition.

Types
Common types of food court include a type which is spacious and has a lot of space for consumers to sit, but does not have much food to buy. Another type is a food court which is small, and does not have an area for consumers to sit in, but has a lot of types of food open to consumption. The former type of food court, in 3rd world nations may not have as much profit, because people in those areas will generally want different types of food.

See also

 Food hall
 Cafeteria
 Hawker centre

References

External links
 
 

Restaurants by type
Shopping mall facilities